Orbaizeta is a town and municipality located in the province and autonomous community of Navarre, northern Spain.

History

On 15–17 October 1794, the Battle of Orbaizeta was fought in the area. General Bon-Adrien Jeannot de Moncey led the French Army of the western Pyrenees to victory over General Pedro Téllez-Girón, 9th Duke of Osuna, who commanded the Spanish army. During the fighting, the French army seized the cannon foundry located four km north of the town.

References

External links
 ORBAIZETA in the Bernardo Estornés Lasa - Auñamendi Encyclopedia (Euskomedia Fundazioa) 

Municipalities in Navarre